Khalil Kandi (also Romanized as Khalīl Kandī; also known as Maḥtesham Kandī) is a village in Qeshlaq-e Shomali Rural District, in the Central District of Parsabad County, Ardabil Province, Iran. At the 2006 census, its population was 56, in 10 families.

References 

Towns and villages in Parsabad County